1994 World Ice Hockey Championships may refer to:
 1994 Men's World Ice Hockey Championships
 1994 IIHF Women's World Championship